Three Women and A Half 三个半女人 is a top-rated drama series in Singapore filmed by Matrix Vision and screened on MediaCorp TV Channel 8 in 2001. It starred Huang Wenyong, Aileen Tan, Huang Biren, Lin Meijiao and Vivian Lai. The plot mainly revolves around three office ladies Jane, Monica and Rachel competing with one another in an advertising firm in a bid to climb the corporate ladder.

Synopsis
See synopsis here

2001 Accolades
The serial was nominated and won awards at the Star Awards 2001 such as Best Drama Serial. Huang Biren and Aileen Tan were nominated Best Actress for the show, which Aileen won, while Huang Wenyong was nominated Best Actor. The show has also achieved the highest viewership of the year during its telecast.

External links
Official Website (Old)
Official Website (New)

Singapore Chinese dramas
2001 Singaporean television series debuts
2001 Singaporean television series endings
Channel 8 (Singapore) original programming